Land surface effects on climate are wide-ranging and vary by region.  Deforestation and exploitation of natural landscapes play a significant role. Some of these environmental changes are similar to those caused by the effects of global warming.

Deforestation effects

Major land surface changes affecting climate include deforestation (especially in tropical areas), and destruction of grasslands and xeric woodlands by overgrazing, or lack of grazing.  These changes in the natural landscape reduce evapotranspiration, and thus water vapor, in the atmosphere, limiting clouds and precipitation.  It has been proposed, in the journal Atmospheric Chemistry and Physics, that evaporation rates from forested areas may exceed that of the oceans, creating zones of low pressure, which enhance the development of storms and rainfall through atmospheric moisture recycling. The American Institute of Biological Sciences published a similar paper in support of this concept in 2009.  In addition, with deforestation and/or destruction of grasslands, the amount of dew harvested (or condensed) by plants is greatly diminished. All of this contributes to desertification in these regions.

In an article published by Science, it is mentioned that 25-50% of the rainfall in the Amazon basin comes from the forest, and if deforestation reaches 30-40% most of the Amazon basin will enter a permanent dry climate.

This concept of land-atmosphere feedback is common among permaculturists, such as Masanobu Fukuoka, who, in his book, The One Straw Revolution, said "rain comes from the ground, not the sky."

Deforestation, and conversion of grasslands to desert, may also lead to cooling of the regional climate.  This is because of the albedo effect (sunlight reflected by bare ground) during the day, and rapid radiation of heat into space at night, due to the lack of vegetation and atmospheric moisture.

Reforestation, conservation grazing, holistic land management, and, in drylands,
water harvesting and keyline design, are examples of methods that might help prevent or lessen these drying effects.

Mountain meteorological effects

Orographic lift

Orographic lift occurs when an air mass is forced from a low elevation to a higher elevation as it moves over rising terrain. As the air mass gains altitude it quickly cools down adiabatically, which can raise the relative humidity to 100% and create clouds and, under the right conditions, precipitation.

Rain shadow

A rain shadow is a dry area on the leeward side of a mountainous area (away from the wind). The mountains block the passage of rain-producing weather systems and cast a "shadow" of dryness behind them. Wind and moist air is drawn by the prevailing winds towards the top of the mountains, where it condenses and precipitates before it crosses the top. In an effect opposite that of orographic lift, the air, without much moisture left, advances behind the mountains creating a drier side called the "rain shadow".

Foehn wind

A föhn or foehn is a type of dry, warm, down-slope wind that occurs in the lee (downwind side) of a mountain range.

It is a rain shadow wind that results from the subsequent adiabatic warming of air that has dropped most of its moisture on windward slopes (see orographic lift). As a consequence of the different adiabatic lapse rates of moist and dry air, the air on the leeward slopes becomes warmer than equivalent elevations on the windward slopes. Föhn winds can raise temperatures by as much as 14 °C (25 °F) in just a matter of minutes. Central Europe enjoys a warmer climate due to the Föhn, as moist winds off the Mediterranean Sea blow over the Alps.

See also

Forest restoration
Ecological engineering
Restoration ecology
Deforestation and climate change
Assisted natural regeneration
Moisture recycling
Evapotranspiration
Precipitationshed
Water cycle
Tropical rain belt
Tropical rainforest conservation
Climate engineering
Weather modification
Desert greening
Al Baydha Project
Great Plains Shelterbelt
Great Green Wall, forest initiative in the African Sahel
Three-North Shelter Forest Program, also known as China's "Green Great Wall"

References

External links 
YouTube interview with Susan Martinez, Ph.D., on "global drying" theory
YouTube presentation: "Do forests attract rain?" from the Center for International Forestry Research
YouTube TEDx presentation by Peter Westerveld on restored land helping to bring rain
YouTube TED presentation by Allan Savory on using conservation grazing to green desert areas
YouTube: "Green Desert," a documentary film about the effects of deforestation in Indonesia

 
Climate change and the environment
Climate change feedbacks
Climate forcing
Deforestation
Desertification
Forest conservation